Sir Maurice Sydney Lipworth KC (Hon) (born 13 May 1931), is a South African lawyer, businessman, public servant and philanthropist.

Early life
Lipworth was born in Johannesburg, South Africa, in 1931 and was educated at King Edward VII School in Johannesburg.

Career
He is a co-founder of Hambro Life Assurance with Sir Mark Weinberg and Lord Joel Joffe in the UK (subsequently called Allied Dunbar Assurance and now Zurich Financial Services) (1971–1988).

From 1988 to 1993 he served as Chairman of the Monopolies and Mergers Commission in the UK (now the Competition Commission). He subsequently served as Chairman of Zeneca plc (now AstraZeneca plc) and Deputy Chairman of National Westminster Bank plc. He also served as Chairman of the Financial Reporting Council and founding Trustee of the International Accounting Standards Committee Foundation (until 2005).

He is also President of the Philharmonia Orchestra Trust, as well as holding several other directorships and charitable appointments involved with the arts.

Lipworth was knighted in 1991. He was called to the London Bar, appointed QC (hc) (1993) and is a Bencher, Inner Temple. He is a member of the Chambers at One Essex Court. He was awarded an honorary LL.D from the University of the Witwatersrand in 2003.

References

British corporate directors
Members of the Inner Temple
English Jews
Knights Bachelor
Alumni of King Edward VII School (Johannesburg)
1931 births
Living people
AstraZeneca people
South African chairpersons of corporations
20th-century South African lawyers
Honorary King's Counsel
English King's Counsel
20th-century King's Counsel
21st-century King's Counsel